Millie Boyle (born 19 May 1998) is an Australian professional rugby league footballer who currently co-captains the Newcastle Knights in the NRL Women's Premiership.

Boyle previously played rugby union as a flanker. She is a dual-code international, having played for both the Australian Jillaroos and Australian Wallaroos. She won two premierships with the Brisbane Broncos in the NRLW.

Background
Born in Cobargo, New South Wales, Boyle's father, David, and her uncle, Jason Croker, were professional rugby league players for the Canberra Raiders. Her brother, Morgan, and her cousin, Lachlan Croker, play for the Manly Warringah Sea Eagles. Until the age of 12, she played rugby league with boys.

Playing career

Rugby union
When Boyle was at school, she began playing rugby union. In high school, she played for the Brumbies schoolgirls team. When Bond University Rugby Club offered her a playing position in the University rugby sevens league, she moved from her native Canberra to the Gold Coast.

In the National Women's Rugby Championship, Boyle played for the Australian Capital Territory, making her debut in 2016. At the age of 19, she was called up to the Australia women's national rugby union team, known as the Wallaroos, for the 2017 Women's Rugby World Cup in Ireland. Boyle was the youngest player to be selected. She had impressed while playing for the team in the Four Nations tournament, which the Walleroos officials stated was the reason for her selection at the World Cup.

In 2019, she played for the Queensland Reds Super Rugby team.

Rugby league
In 2019, Boyle returned to rugby league, joining the Burleigh Bears in the South East Queensland women's division. In May 2019, she represented South East Queensland at the NRL Women's National Championships. On 21 June 2019, she made her debut for New South Wales in their 14–4 win over Queensland. In July 2019, she signed with the Brisbane Broncos NRL Women's Premiership team.

In Round 1 of the 2019 NRL Women's season, Boyle made her debut for the Broncos in their 14–4 win over the St George Illawarra Dragons. On 6 October 2019, she started at prop in the Broncos' 30–6 Grand Final win over the Dragons.

In October 2019, she represented Australia at the World Cup 9s tournament. On 25 October 2019, she made her Test debut for Australia in their 28–8 win over New Zealand.

On 25 October 2020, she started at prop in the Broncos' 20–10 Grand Final win over the Sydney Roosters.

On 18 May 2022, the Newcastle Knights announced the signing of Boyle and Tamika Upton ahead of the 2022 NRL Women's season.

Boyle made her club debut for the Knights in round 1 of the 2022 NRLW season against her former club the Brisbane Broncos.

In late September 2022, Boyle was named in the Dream Team announced by the Rugby League Players Association. The team was selected by the players, who each cast one vote for each position.

On 2 October 2022, Boyle captained the Knights in their 32-12 NRLW Grand Final win over the Parramatta Eels.

Controversy
On 26 August 2021, Boyle was sanctioned by the NRL after an alleged incident with Canterbury-Bankstown player Adam Elliott. 

Boyle was alleged to have met Elliott at a Gold Coast restaurant, where the pair entered the men's toilet and started kissing Elliott and removing his shirt before both were ordered to leave the premises.

Boyle was issued a warning by the NRL for her conduct, and was given education and training regarding the obligations of NRL and NRLW players in public, while Elliott was deemed to be the instigator and was fined $10,000 for failing to comply with biosecurity protocols and bringing the game into disrepute.

Achievements and accolades

Individual
NRLW Rookie of the Year: 2019
Brisbane Broncos Best Forward: 2019

Team
2019 NRLW Grand Final: Brisbane Broncos – Winners
2020 NRLW Grand Final: Brisbane Broncos – Winners
2022 NRLW Grand Final: Newcastle Knights - Winners

References

External links
Newcastle Knights profile

1998 births
Living people
Australia women's international rugby union players
Australian female rugby league players
Australian female rugby union players
Brisbane Broncos (NRLW) players
Newcastle Knights (NRLW) players
Newcastle Knights (NRLW) captains
People from New South Wales
Rugby union flankers
Rugby league players from New South Wales
Rugby union players from New South Wales
Rugby league props